Kaunas Castle is a medieval castle in Kaunas, the second-largest city in Lithuania. Archeological evidence suggests that it was originally built during the mid-14th century, in the Gothic style. Its site is strategic – a rise on the banks of the Nemunas River near its confluence with the Neris River. At the beginning of the 21st century, about one-third of the castle was still standing.

History
The precise construction date of the first Kaunas Castle is unknown. Archaeological data suggests that a stone castle was built on the site during the middle of the 14th century.

A written account states that in 1361, the Grand Master of the Teutonic Knights Winrich von Kniprode issued an order to gather information about the castle, specifically the thickness of its walls, as preparation for an assault on the castle. In March–April 1362, the castle was besieged by the Teutonic Order. During this attack, the Teutonic Knights constructed a siege tower and erected wall-penetration machinery; primitive fire arms might have been used, since gunpowder technology was emerging in Europe. According to Wigand of Marburg, the castle's garrison consisted of about 400 Lithuanians soldiers, commanded by Vaidotas, son of Duke Kęstutis. After three weeks, the Knights managed to breach the castle's walls, and soon afterwards the castle was taken. On Easter Sunday in 1362, the knights conducted a Mass at the castle to commemorate their victory.
 

Apparently, of the castle's defense force of 400, only 36 survived. Questions remain with regard to the castle's defenders' lack of support from outside during the siege. In any event, Kęstutis soon regained and rebuilt Kaunas Castle, but it remained a point of contention between Lithuanians and Teutonic Knights for many years. In 1384 Kaunas Castle was re-captured by the Teutonic Knights. At this time Grand Master Konrad Zöllner von Rotenstein began reconstruction of Kaunas Castle and renamed it Marienwerder. The presence of the Knights in Kaunas meant that the entire defensive system of castles along the Nemunas was threatened. Confronting this situation, the Lithuanians launched an attack on the castle later the same year.

It seems likely that the Lithuanians mustered an army near Vilnius as a strategic maneuver, since Lithuanians could use the downstream flow of the Neris River to transport artillery and military provisions from Vilnius; the Knights were forced to use overland or upstream transport. During the 1384 assault, the Lithuanians deployed cannons and trebuchets; the besieged Teutonic Knights had also installed cannons in the castle, which apparently destroyed the Lithuanians' trebuchet. Nevertheless, the castle was retaken by the Lithuanians.

After 1398, the Teutonic Knights were no longer able to reconquer the castle. After the Battle of Grunwald, Kaunas Castle lost its strategic military importance and was used as a residence. The castle served administrative purposes after the death of Vytautas the Great. Sigismund Augustus gave this castle to his wife Barbara Radziwill in 1549. During the 16th century, the castle was strengthened and adapted to new defensive purposes by the construction of an artillery bastion near the round tower. At the bottom of the bastion a firing gallery was installed, which was linked with the tower.

In 1601, Kaunas Castle housed courts and an archive. At some time in 1611, part of the castle was flooded by the Neris River. 

Due to its convenient location, it was used by the Swedish military during its war with the Polish–Lithuanian Commonwealth, after which its military functions ceased. In the mid-17th century, large portions of the castle were again flooded. The castle was used as a prison in the 18th century; later the Russian administration granted permission for houses to be built in the castle's territory, which resulted in significant damage to the castle itself.

Kaunas city and this castle was mentioned in the famous Lithuanian and Polish poet Adam Mickiewicz poem Konrad Wallenrod (1828), by set in the 14th-century Grand Duchy of Lithuania. 

For many years afterwards, Kaunas castle stood abandoned. In the 1960s the round tower was opened as a museum, but due to the tower's structural deterioration, the museum was transferred elsewhere.

Conservation of the castle

Protection of the castle began in 1930; nearby houses were demolished, and the territory was examined by archeologists. Further efforts to preserve the castle were made in the 1950s. At this time the round tower underwent some repair; later the firing bastion was excavated from beneath several overlying strata. The excavated bastion was in very good condition. As part of its protection, temporary roofing was put in place there, as well as on the remaining towers and walls. The remaining portions of the round tower were not reconstructed to their original height, nor were the castle walls; the bigger part of them are only remaining foundations of the walls.

Archeological excavations continued at Kaunas Castle, interrupted by periods of inactivity. The evidence gathered from these archeological works suggests that the configuration of the castle, excluding the bastion, has remained in the form it took during its reconstruction in 1376.

Today

Major reconstruction work started in 2010 and ended in 2011. In 2011, a branch of the Kaunas City Museum was established in Kaunas Castle. The castle is open to tourism, and hosts occasional festivals. A new sculpture "" (represents the Vytis) was erected near Kaunas castle on 14 July 2018. The "Freedom Warrior" is almost seven meters high and was cast in Ukraine. A bronze horseman with a horse was placed at the castle of Kaunas on a granite pedestal. In 2019 Kaunas City museum with Kaunas Castle became a new Member of Association of Castles and Museums around the Baltic Sea.

See also
List of castles in Lithuania
Gothic architecture in Lithuania
Kaunas Fortress

References

Further reading
 Kauno istorijos metraštis. Kaunas, V tomas, 2004
 S. Thurnbull. Crusader Castles of the Teutonic Knights. Osprey Publishing, 2003
 R. Jasas. Vygandas Marburgietis. Naujoji Prūsijos kronika. Vilnius, 1999

External links

Kaunas Castle, Kaunas City Museum
 The Association of Castles and Museums around the Baltic Sea
      

Brick Gothic
Castles in Lithuania
Castle
Castle
Castle
Gothic architecture in Lithuania
Castles of the Teutonic Knights
Tourist attractions in Kaunas
Castles of the Grand Duchy of Lithuania
Objects listed in Lithuanian Registry of Cultural Property